

Medalists

Seeds
Singles matches were best of 7 games in the main draw.

  Xu Xin
  Ma Long
  Chuang Chih-Yuan
  Jun Mizutani
  Yan An
  Gao Ning
  Jiang Tianyi
  Koki Niwa
  Kenta Matsudaira
  Seiya Kishikawa
  Fan Zhendong
  Tang Peng
  Kazuhiro Chan
  Zhou Yu
  Noshad Alamiyan
  Cho Eon-Rae

Draw

Finals

Section 1

Section 2

Section 3

Section 4

Section 5

Section 6

Section 7

Section 8

References
 21st Asian Championships Busan 2013 Competition Schedule Draw and Results

2013 Asian Table Tennis Championships